Rheden is a municipality and a town in the eastern Netherlands.

Population centres 
Population of the seven villages on 1 January 2013

Topography

Dutch Topographic map of the municipality of Rheden, June 2015

Transportation

 Railway stations: Dieren, Rheden, Velp

Notable residents

Public thinking and Public Service 
 Lubbert Jan van Eck (1719 in Velp - 1765) the 31st Governor of Ceylon
 Theodoor Johan Arnold van Zijll de Jong (1836 in Velp - 1917) commander of the Royal Netherlands East Indies Army
 Daniël de Blocq van Scheltinga (1903 in Velp – 1962) a Dutch Nazi politician
 Hans van den Broek (born 1936) a retired Dutch politician, member of the municipal council 1970 to 1974
 Sammy van Tuyll van Serooskerken (born 1951 in Velp) a Dutch politician
 Tom Middendorp (born 1960 in Rheden) a retired general of the Royal Netherlands Army 
 Erik Proper (born 1967 in Rheden) a Dutch computer scientist
 Melanie Schultz van Haegen (born 1970 in Laag-Soeren) a retired Dutch politician and businesswoman
 Princess Marilène of Orange-Nassau, van Vollenhoven (born 1970 in Dieren) the wife of Prince Maurits of Orange-Nassau, van Vollenhoven

The Arts 
 Mina Kruseman (1839 in Velp – 1922) a 19th-century Dutch feminist, actress and author
 Louis Couperus  (1863 – 1923 in De Steeg) a Dutch novelist and poet
 Baroness Ella van Heemstra (1900 in Velp – 1984) a Dutch-British aristocrat and the mother of Audrey Hepburn
 Simon Carmiggelt (1913–1987) author, who had a home in De Steeg
 Teun Jacob (1927 in Rheden - 2009) a Dutch wall painter and sculptor
 Jan Siebelink (born 1938 in Velp) a Dutch author
 Paula van der Oest (born 1965 in Laag-Soeren) a Dutch film director and screenwriter
 Anouk van Dijk (born 1965 in Velp) a Dutch choreographer, dancer, artistic director and teacher
 Maarten Demmink (born 1967 in Goudriaan), known as Demiak, a Dutch painter, photographer and sculptor
 Jorrit van der Kooi (born 1972 in Rheden) a Dutch film and TV director and presenter

Sport 
 Jo Teunissen-Waalboer (1919 in Velp – 1991) a Dutch javelin thrower, competed at the 1948 Summer Olympics
 Henk Bosveld (1941 in Velp – 1998) a Dutch football midfielder, with over 500 club caps
 Karel Aalbers (born 1949 in Velp) President of Vitesse Arnhem 1984 to 2000
 René Klaassen (born 1961 in Velp) a former field hockey defender, participated in the 1984 and 1988 Summer Olympics
 Erik Breukink (born 1964 in Rheden) a former professional road racing cyclist
 Edward Gal (born 1970 in Rheden) a Dutch dressage rider, triple gold medalists at the 2010 FEI World Equestrian Games
 Ho-Pin Tung (born 1982 in Velp) a Chinese-Dutch auto-racing driver
 Jhon van Beukering (born 1983 in Velp) an Indonesian naturalised retired pro. footballer with over 200 club caps

Miscellaneous
The Gazelle bicycle factory is situated in Dieren.

Gallery

References

External links

Official website

 
Municipalities of Gelderland
Populated places in Gelderland